Nadia Niazi is a Moroccan actress.

Filmography 
 2009: Terminus des anges
 2010: La famille marche à l'ombre
 2011: L'amante du Rif
 2013: Exit Maroc
 2013: C'est eux les chiens
 2015: Ta mère ! 
 2018: Apatride
 2018: Sofia

References

External links 
 

21st-century Moroccan actresses
Living people
Year of birth missing (living people)